Edward Ellice, the younger (19 August 1810 – 2 August 1880) was a British Liberal Party politician and landowner.

Life
He was the eldest son of Edward Ellice, from his first marriage to Hannah Althea Grey, the youngest sister of Charles Grey, 2nd Earl Grey. The Ellice family was English by descent, and had settled in Aberdeenshire in the mid-17th century. Edward Ellice was born in London in 1810 and was educated at Eton College (1823–1836) and at Trinity College, Cambridge. He matriculated at the University of Cambridge on the 6 June 1828 and in 1831 was awarded a Master of Arts degree without having first obtained a bachelor's degree.

In 1832, he was appointed as Private Secretary to John Lambton, 1st Earl of Durham for his diplomatic mission to Russia. Lord Durham was a close friend and a relative of Ellice's father, having married the Earl Grey's second daughter. Ellice was an unsuccessful candidate for Inverness Burghs in the 1835 general election, but was elected to represent Huddersfield in a May 1837 by-election. In the general election that year he was elected to represent St Andrews Burghs, a seat he held until 1880.

Ellice continued as Durham's private secretary during his term as Governor General of the Province of Canada; whilst he was working in Canada, his wife Katherine and her sister were captured for six days during the Rebellions of 1837–1838.

He remained a backbencher throughout his political career, taking special interest in the reform of the Scottish Poor Laws. He supported the idea of "clearance", but viewed indiscriminate forcible eviction of the peasantry as "cruel and indefensible".

He was offered a peerage by William Gladstone in 1869, but declined the offer, and retired from Parliament in early 1880, shortly before his death aged 69.

Ellice married the diarist Katherine Jane Balfour, daughter of General Balfour of Balbirnie, in 1834. She accompanied him to Russia and Canada. In Canada she was taken prisoner for ten days. Following her death in 1864, he married in 1867 Eliza Stewart, daughter of Thomas Campbell Hagart of Bantaskine, widow of Alexander Spiers of Elderslie.

References

Oliver & Boyd's new Edinburgh almanac and national repository for the year 1850. Oliver & Boyd, Edinburgh, 1850
Jonathan Spain, "Ellice, Edward (1810–1880)", Oxford Dictionary of National Biography, Oxford University Press, Sept 2004; online edn, May 2006 accessed 11 July 2006

External links 
 

1810 births
1880 deaths
People educated at Eton College
Alumni of Trinity College, Cambridge
Members of the Parliament of the United Kingdom for English constituencies
Members of the Parliament of the United Kingdom for Scottish constituencies
UK MPs 1835–1837
UK MPs 1837–1841
UK MPs 1841–1847
UK MPs 1847–1852
UK MPs 1852–1857
UK MPs 1857–1859
UK MPs 1859–1865
UK MPs 1865–1868
UK MPs 1868–1874
UK MPs 1874–1880
Members of the Parliament of the United Kingdom for Fife constituencies
19th-century Scottish politicians
Ellice family